Nancy & Lee is a collaborative studio album by Nancy Sinatra and Lee Hazlewood, released on Reprise Records in 1968. Arranged and conducted by Billy Strange, the album was produced by Lee Hazlewood. It peaked at number 13 on the Billboard 200 chart. In 2017, Pitchfork placed it at number 87 on the "200 Best Albums of the 1960s" list.

Track listing

2022 reissue
On May 20, 2022, Light in the Attic Records with the participation of Sinatra, released the first official reissue of Nancy & Lee. The remastered album was released in multiple formats including vinyl LP, CD, cassette, 8-track tape, and digital, and includes two bonus tracks from the album recording sessions.

Charts

References

External links
 
 

1968 albums
Nancy Sinatra albums
Lee Hazlewood albums
Vocal duet albums
Albums arranged by Billy Strange
Albums conducted by Billy Strange
Albums produced by Lee Hazlewood
Reprise Records albums